Alachlor is an herbicide from the chloroacetanilide family. It is an odorless, white solid. The greatest use of alachlor is for control of annual grasses and broadleaf weeds in crops. Use of alachlor is illegal in the European Union and no products containing alachlor are currently registered in the United States.
  
Its mode of action is elongase inhibition, and inhibition of geranylgeranyl pyrophosphate (GGPP) cyclisation enzymes, part of the gibberellin pathway. It is marketed under the trade names Alanex, Bronco, Cannon, Crop Star, Intrro, Lariat, Lasso, Micro-Tech and Partner.

Uses
The largest use of alachlor is as a herbicide for control of annual grasses and broadleaf weeds in crops, primarily on corn, sorghum, and soybeans.

Application details
Alachlor mixes well with other herbicides. It is marketed in mixed formulations with atrazine, glyphosate, trifluralin and imazaquin. It is a selective, systemic herbicide, absorbed by germinating shoots and by roots.  Its mode of action is elongase inhibition, and inhibition of geranylgeranyl pyrophosphate (GGPP) cyclisation enzymes, part of the gibberellin pathway.  Stated more simply,  it works by interfering with a plant's ability to produce protein and by interfering with root growth.

It is most commonly available as microgranules containing 15% active ingredients (AI), or emulsifiable concentrate containing 480 g/ litre of AI. Homologuation in Europe requires a maximum dose of 2,400 g per hectare of AI, or 5 litres/hectare of emulsifiable concentrate or 17 kg/ha of microgranules. The products are applied as either pre-drilling, soil incorporated or pre-emergence.

Safety
The United States Environmental Protection Agency (EPA) classifies the herbicide as toxicity class III - slightly toxic. The Maximum Contaminant Level Goal (MCLG) for Alachlor is zero, to prevent long-term effects. The Maximum Contaminant Level (MCL) for drinking water is two parts per billion (2 ppb).

The EPA cited the following long-term effects for exposures at levels above the MCL in drinking water exposed to runoff from herbicide used on row crops: slight skin and eye irritation; at lifetime exposure to levels above the MCL: potential damage to liver, kidney, spleen; lining of nose and eyelids; cancer. The major source of environmental release of alachlor is through its manufacture and use as a herbicide. Alachlor was detected in rural domestic well water by EPA's National Survey of Pesticides in Drinking Water Wells. EPA's Pesticides in Ground Water Database reports detections of alachlor in ground water at concentrations above the MCL in at least 15 U.S. states.

Alachlor is a controlled substance under Australian law and is listed as a Schedule 7 (Dangerous Poison) substance. Access, use and storage are strictly controlled under state and territory law. Since 2006, use of alachlor as a herbicide has been banned in the European Union.

In "a judgment that could lend weight to other health claims against pesticides," in January, 2012 a French court found Monsanto, which manufactures Lasso, liable for chemical poisoning of a French farmer in 2004. In 2015 a French appeals court upheld the ruling and ordered the company to "fully compensate" the grower.

Environmental fate
Alachlor exhibits moderate sorption in soil, ranging from 43-209 mL/g.  Photodegradation is a minor contributor to alachlor fate.  Degradation in soil appears to be largely biologically mediated, and produces multiple metabolites. The half life in aerobic soil ranges from about 6 to 15 days and is considerably shorter under anaerobic conditions. One possible explanation for the short anaerobic half life is the observation that alachlor is rapidly transformed under anoxia to up to 14 degradation products in the presence of iron-bearing ferruginous smectites. The iron in such minerals can be used by certain soil bacteria as an electron acceptor when soils are flooded, thus the process of herbicide transformation by reduced clay is thought to be microbially mediated.  Similar observations have been reported for the herbicides trifluralin and atrazine.

Alachlor is often used in high school chemistry classrooms as a reactant in demonstrations such as the combustion of magnesium. Alachlor can be used as a substitution for methane gas in such an experiment when gas is not available.

See also 
 Acetochlor
 Metolachlor
 Butachlor

References

Herbicides
Organochlorides
Endocrine disruptors
Ethers
Acetanilides
Alkyl-substituted benzenes